Kannanchery is a suburb in Kozhikode City, situated 4 kilometers from its center.

Description
Kannanchery or (Kannancheri) is a developing suburb in Kozhikode city. Kannancheri is famous because of the Kannancheri Sree Maha Ganapathi Temple and its festivals and rituals. It is located in the middle of Vattakinar, Thiruvannur, Panniyankara and Meenchanda. There are two mosques and up to 7 small and main temples are located in this place. There is one huge pond near the Kannancheri  SreeMaha Ganapathy temple and another small pond at Kottiyaat Sree Bhagavathi Temple.

This place once used to be a weaver's village. This street/theru was given to weavers by zamoothiri king. Now many people have migrated from various places and they all are trying to make this place developed and are undergoing good manners. Two bus waiting sheds are in place, Nearest railway station is at Kallai. There are few education institutions located in this area. Mr. Nambidi Narayanan and Shri. Nirmala is the present ward councillor of Kannanchery.

Education institutions
Kannanchery Government LP School
Ramakrishna Mission School
Bright Academy
Excel Pre-Primary School

References

External links 
 https://web.archive.org/web/20190812151749/https://kozhikode.nic.in/
 http://www.kozhikodecorporation.org
http://kannancheryganapathitemple.com/

Suburbs of Kozhikode